The canton of Le Fumélois is an administrative division of the Lot-et-Garonne department, southwestern France. It was created at the French canton reorganisation which came into effect in March 2015. Its seat is in Fumel.

It consists of the following communes:
 
Anthé
Blanquefort-sur-Briolance
Bourlens
Cazideroque
Condezaygues
Courbiac
Cuzorn
Fumel
Lacapelle-Biron
Masquières
Monsempron-Libos
Montayral
Saint-Front-sur-Lémance
Saint-Georges
Saint-Vite
Sauveterre-la-Lémance
Thézac
Tournon-d'Agenais
Trentels

References

Cantons of Lot-et-Garonne